David Harris Cohen is an American neuroscientist, physiologist, and academic administrator. He is the provost at the University of the People. Cohen was president of the Society for Neuroscience. He was vice president and dean of the faculty at the Columbia Graduate School of Arts and Sciences from 1995 to 2003 and provost of Northwestern University from 1986 to 1995.

Life 
Cohen completed a A.B., magna cum laude, at Harvard University in 1960. He earned a Ph.D. in neurobiology in 1963 at University of California, Berkeley.

Cohen was an assistant professor of physiology at Case Western Reserve University. From 1968 to 1979, Cohen was an associate professor of physiology at University of Virginia. Cohen was an associate professor of physiology and chair of the neuroscience department from 1979 to 1986 at Stony Brook University.

Cohen was the provost of Northwestern University from 1986 to 1995. Cohen joined the Columbia Graduate School of Arts and Sciences in 1995 as the vice president and dean of the faculty. He left Columbia University at the end of the 2002-2003 academic year. In December 2009, Cohen became provost of the University of the People.

Cohen served as president of the Society for Neuroscience. He is a past chair of the Association of American Medical Colleges. Coen was an associate editor of The Journal of Neuroscience.

References

External links
 

Living people
Year of birth missing (living people)
Place of birth missing (living people)
Harvard University alumni
University of California, Berkeley alumni
Case Western Reserve University alumni
University of Virginia faculty
Columbia University faculty
American physiologists
American neuroscientists
20th-century American biologists
21st-century American biologists
Stony Brook University faculty
University of the People faculty
American academic administrators